Arusha Accords refers to two separate political agreements, negotiated in Arusha, Tanzania:
Arusha Accords (Rwanda), a 1993 agreement
Arusha Accords (Burundi), a 2000 agreement

It may also refer to:
The Arusha Accord, a United Kingdom metal band

See also
 Arusha Declaration, a 1967 declaration calling for African socialism and other reforms
 Arusha Agreement, a 1969 agreement with the European Communities